The 2017 Quito Challenger was a professional tennis tournament played on clay courts. It was the 21st edition of the tournament which was part of the 2017 ATP Challenger Tour. It took place in Quito, Ecuador between 28 August and 3 September 2017.

Singles main-draw entrants

Seeds

 1 Rankings are as of 21 August 2017.

Other entrants
The following players received wildcards into the singles main draw:
  Emilio Gómez
  Diego Hidalgo
  Gonzalo Lama
  Renzo Olivo

The following player received entry into the singles main draw as an alternate:
  Cristian Rodríguez

The following players received entry from the qualifying draw:
  Pedro Sakamoto
  Carlos Salamanca
  Manuel Sánchez
  Juan Pablo Varillas

Champions

Singles

 Nicolás Jarry def.  Gerald Melzer 6–3, 6–2.

Doubles

 Marcelo Arévalo /  Miguel Ángel Reyes-Varela def.  Nicolás Jarry /  Roberto Quiroz 4–6, 6–4, [10–7].

References

2017 ATP Challenger Tour
2017
2017 in Ecuadorian sport
August 2017 sports events in South America
September 2017 sports events in South America